Asclepios is a program of space analogue missions designed by students for students, under the mentorship of trained professionals. It seeks to simulate short-term space missions on another celestial body, such as the Moon or Mars, thus paving the way to the future space exploration of the solar system.

The Asclepios missions are exclusively opened to students with the goal of arousing their interest in future space endeavors as astronauts, space engineers or members of the Mission Control Center.  The goal is to help the space domain test and experiment their processes or products in a realistic environment. The stated objectives of this effort are to act as an enabler for scientific entities, train students through their work and promote space sciences. Experts in the area such as the Swiss astronaut Claude Nicollier act as mentors and advisors regarding the mission preparation.

History 
This Asclepios program was launched in August 2019 by Marcellin Féasson and Chloé Carrière, both physics students at EPFL (École Polytechnique Fédérale de Lausanne) with the goal to federate students to prepare and perform an analogue space mission. Recruitment efforts for the team started in September 2019 in preparation for the Asclepios I mission while candidacy to join the analogue astronaut crew were received from students worldwide.

The first mission of the program, Asclepios I, was organized in July 2021 in the Bernese Alps at the Grimsel Test Site after having been postponed due to the COVID-19 pandemic. It was the realization of the 70 project members coming from more than 20 countries around the world. 

Since November 2020, Asclepios has been recognized by EPFL (École Polytechnique Fédérale de Lausanne) as a MAKE project, making it an interdisciplinary student effort with an educational impact.

Asclepios program

Asclepios I 
Asclepios I was a Moon analogue mission focusing on short-duration (8 days) scientific mission in Lunar lava tubes. It was organised in July 2021 and located in the tunnels of the Grimsel Test Site of the swiss nuclear waste technical competence centre Nagra (National Cooperative for the Disposal of Radioactive Waste) located in the Swiss Alps. Experiments were conducted during the mission in collaboration with academic laboratories and companies. They included psychological study of the analogue astronauts behaviour, environmental studies and product testing of space related technical solutions. Some of the experiments required to perform extravehicular activities with simulated spacesuits. Selected from 200 applicants, students forming the astronaut crew were six analogue astronauts with specialized roles (commander, base engineer, payload specialist, communication specialist and health officers) with 2 supporting back-ups. The astronauts were supported at all times by a Mission Control Center composed only of students trained to follow procedures inspired by those of the European Space Agency.

Asclepios II 
Currently in the early stages of organization.

See also 
 HI-SEAS
 Human mission to Mars
 Mars to Stay
 Psychological and sociological effects of spaceflight
 ISS year-long mission
 List of Mars analogs

References

External links 

 Official website
 Asclepios I mission
 RTS info
 Nagra GTS
 EPFL

Space missions